The following is a list of Michigan State Historic Sites in Lenawee County, Michigan. Sites marked with a dagger (†) are also listed on the National Register of Historic Places in Lenawee County, Michigan.


Current listings

See also
 National Register of Historic Places listings in Lenawee County, Michigan

Sources
 Historic Sites Online – Lenawee County. Michigan State Housing Developmental Authority. Accessed March 30, 2011.

References

Lenawee County
State Historic Sites
Tourist attractions in Lenawee County, Michigan